Alexander Pierce Paterson (June 17, 1870 – January 1, 1957) was a Canadian politician. He served in the Legislative Assembly of New Brunswick as member of the Liberal party from 1935 to 1939. He also briefly served as Minister of Education
and Municipal and Federal Affairs.

References

1870 births
1957 deaths
20th-century Canadian politicians
New Brunswick Liberal Association MLAs